The Ford Transit Connect is a compact panel van sold by Ford since 2002.  Developed by Ford of Europe, the model line replaced sedan-based vans (Ford Escort and Ford Courier vans) with a dedicated commercial vehicle platform.  The model line is the second-smallest vehicle of the Ford Transit range, slotted between the Ford Transit Courier LAV and the Ford Transit Custom LCV/MPV.  In line with other Ford Transit variants, passenger-oriented models (in Europe) are marketed as the Ford Tourneo Connect with side windows and rear seats.

The first and second-generation Transit Connect has been imported to North America from the 2010 model year.  To circumvent the 25% "chicken tax" on imported light trucks, all examples have been imported as passenger vans, with cargo vans converted to the intended configuration after their importation.  In the region, the Transit Connect does not have a direct predecessor; the closest vehicle to its size was the standard-length Ford Aerostar cargo van, which ceased production in 1997.

The first-generation Transit Connect was assembled by Ford Otosan (Kocaeli, Turkey) along with Ford Romania (Craiova, Romania).  For the second generation, Ford of Europe shifted production to its Ford Valencia Body and Assembly facility (Almussafes, Valencia, Spain).  For 2022, a third generation of the Tourneo Connect was released; based on the Volkswagen Caddy, the model line is assembled by Volkswagen in Poland.



First generation (2002)

The Transit Connect was introduced in Europe in October 2002 as the replacement for car-derived vans based on the Escort and the Fiesta but as it is built on a dedicated commercial vehicle platform it is not a car-derived van itself. Production of the Escort in Europe ceased in 2000 (although the vans carried on for another two years), whilst the Fiesta Courier was also planned to be discontinued when the fifth generation Fiesta entered production in 2002. Ford elected not to develop a direct sedan delivery version of the Focus, instead pursuing a purpose-built design.

Sharing few components with the much larger Transit, the Transit Connect was built on a dedicated commercial vehicle platform C170 similar to the international Ford Focus, then common with the first generation North American Ford Focus. Rather than adapting an existing bodystyle into a van, the Transit Connect was designed with sliding side doors.

The Escort van and the Fiesta Courier had been assembled at the Halewood and Dagenham plants in England, respectively, but both plants were to cease Ford car production (Halewood was to be handed over to Jaguar, whilst Dagenham was to become an engine plant only), so a new production facility was needed.

The Transit Connect was assembled by Otosan in an all-new production facility at Gölcük, near Kocaeli, Turkey.

In its first year on the North American market, the Transit Connect was awarded "North American Truck of the Year 2010" at the North American International Auto Show (NAIAS).

2009 update
Since mid-2009, the Transit Connect has been imported to the United States and Canada. First shown in the United States at the 2008 Chicago Auto Show, the 2010 production model was introduced at the following year's show on 11 February 2009.

The introduction of the North American variant coincided with a mid-cycle facelift which includes a restyled front grille, a deeper front bumper and a new dashboard featuring the switchgear and instrument pod from the C307 Focus.

Initially, only the long-wheelbase version of the van, outfitted with a 2.0L four-cylinder petrol engine and 4 speed 4F27E, was offered in North America; elsewhere, the 1.8L diesel engine and 5 speed manual transmission was the only available powertrain.  The 2.0L Duratec DOHC I-4 gasoline engine has 136 hp @6300rpm, and 128 lb.-ft. of torque @4750 rpm.  It specifies minimum 87 octane gasoline and fuel economy is 21 mpg city/27 mpg hwy and 23 mpg combined.

An electric version followed in 2011, converted by Azure Dynamics Corporation at a U.S. facility.

To build interest and awareness in North America, Transit Connects specifically equipped as "mobile showrooms" were displayed at industrial parks and other venues in 13 U.S. urban areas in May 2009, with the goal of offering 3,000 test drives to small business owners.

With model year 2011, Ford offered the Transit Connect XLT Premium Wagon in the US and Canada, a passenger version of the van — with seating for five, rear windows that opened for ventilation, blind spot awareness, rear view camera, larger alloy wheels, body-colour grille, and front fog lamps.

The Transit Connect Wagon was the first Ford minivan since the 2007 discontinuation of the Freestar, though it was closer in size to the standard length Ford Aerostar sold from 1986 to 1997.

Trim levels
In the U.S., the Transit Connect was available in two different trim levels, which are XL and XLT. For passenger models, an XLT Premium model was offered.

Dimensions

Notes

Second generation (2012)

The second generation Transit Connect was introduced on 6 September 2012 in Amsterdam, Netherlands. In its first redesign since its 2002 introduction, the 2014 Transit Connect adopts many features of the Kinetic Design language. A major design change is an optional rear liftgate in addition to the double doors preferred by commercial buyers and wheelchair users. The Transit Connect will include the optional new feature called MyKey, a personalized key system. MyKey owner controls let the vehicle owner program different keys to restrict different vehicle features, such as top speed and maximum radio volume.

Production takes place at Valencia, Spain. As before, to avoid the 25% tariff on imported trucks, all cargo vans sold in the United States are built and shipped as passenger vans, which are then converted to cargo configuration before delivery.

North America
The 2014 Transit Connect is powered by a 2.5-litre inline-4, or a 1.6-litre EcoBoost turbocharged inline-4. The only transmission type available is the 6-speed 6F-35 automatic. For buyers interested in alternative-fuel vehicles, Ford offers optional hardware allowing for the 2.5-litre engine to be converted to use CNG or LPG/propane instead of gasoline.

When sold in the United States, the Tourneo Connect bears the "Transit Connect Wagon" moniker, available in two wheelbases, and with a choice of 5 or 7-passenger seating. The latter configuration is the first 7-passenger minivan sold by Ford since the 2007 discontinuation of the Ford Freestar and Mercury Monterey.

In 2014, it was available in three models, which are XL, XLT, and Titanium.

2019 facelift 
For the 2019 model year, the Transit Connect underwent a mid-cycle revision, receiving updates to the front fascia, with the interior receiving a redesigned dashboard.  Retaining the multiple wheelbases and body heights from its 2014 launch, the facelifted model replaces the 2.5L engine with a 2.0L direct-injection I4 (the 2.5-litre engine remains an option for LPG/CNG conversion).  At the launch of the model facelift, a 1.5L EcoBlue diesel engine was announced; both engines were paired with an 8-speed automatic transmission.  In July 2019, after several delays, production of the diesel Transit Connect was abandoned for North America.

For 2020 production, Ford ended production of the short-wheelbase Transit Connect passenger van, solely offering the three-row body style.

Cargo capacities

Short wheelbase: 122.6 cu ft (3.48 m³) total
 105 cu. ft. (2.97 m³) of cargo space
 100+ cu ft. + Cargo volume behind first row (second-row seats folded)
 50.0+ cu. ft Cargo volume behind second row

Long wheelbase: 168.5 cu ft (4.77 m³) total
 130 cu. ft. (3.68 m³) cargo
 19.8 cu ft Cargo volume behind third row, with seats slid forward
 100+ cu ft. + Cargo volume behind first row (second-row seats folded)

Towing: The 2014 Transit Connect is rated to tow .

Max speed and fuel usage
The 2014–2021 Ford Transit Connect with the 2.5L engine has an est. The 2022 models with the 2.5L engine saw a reduction to  highway.

Safety and recall
In 2017, Ford recalled 2013–2015 Transit Connect with 1.6 ecoboost engines because of a risk of engine fires caused by a “lack of coolant circulation”. The recall partly contributed to a charge of US$300 million by Ford.

Third generation (2021) 

The third-generation Tourneo Connect for the European market was released in October 2021 as a rebadged and restyled fourth-generation Volkswagen Caddy.

Tariff circumvention 
As the Transit Connect is a light truck assembled outside of North America, Ford imports the first and second-generation Transit Connect into the United States as a passenger vehicle, equipping it with rear side windows, rear seats (and rear seat belts) in an effort to circumvent the 25% tariff on imported light trucks, as imported passenger vehicles were subject to a lower 2.5% tariff.  The first-generation vehicles were exported from Turkey to Baltimore on cargo ships owned by Wallenius Wilhelmsen Logistics.  Upon their arrival, cargo examples of the Transit Connect were converted into commercial vehicles at a WWL Vehicle Services Americas Inc. facility.  With the exception of Transit Connect Wagons, rear windows on Transit Connects were replaced by metal panels and rear seats/seatbelts were deleted; the removed parts were recycled.

The process exploited a perceived loophole in the customs definition of a commercial vehicle.  As cargo does not need seats with seat belts or rear windows, presence of those items exempted the vehicle from commercial vehicle status.  While the conversion cost Ford hundreds of dollars per vehicle, the company saved thousands of dollars over paying the tariff.  To streamline the process, Ford only exported the long-wheelbase, high-roof Transit Connect to North America. With a height of 79 inches, the model line was only an inch lower than the lowest-height E-Series van, precluding its access to lower-height parking garages.

For the second generation of the model line, Ford shifted production of the model line from Turkey to Spain, but continued to rely on imported production as a source for the Transit Connect in North America.  In 2013, US Customs told Ford that they must stop this practice of importing vans disguised as passenger cars.  As of July 2018, Ford continued to employ the loophole but remained continuously in court over the practice.  On June 7, 2019, the United States won its appeal in the Federal Appellate Court.  The court determined that the Ford Transit Connect was a vehicle for the transportation of cargo.

Since 2019 production, the conversion process of Transit Connects has undergone major revision.  While all vehicles are still imported from Spain as passenger vehicles and converted to cargo vans (a process that happens to approximately 85% of Transit Connects imported to North America), the conversion no longer involves the disposal/recycling of the removed parts; instead, the removed rear seats and rear window components are shipped back to Ford in Spain for reuse.

Discontinuation in North America 
Ford initially planned to manufacture the third generation of the Transit Connect in Mexico for export to the United States and Canada, instead of manufacturing them in Spain, to avoid having to manufacture the cargo variants of the Transit Connect as passenger vans and then convert them to cargo configuration after entry into the US before being delivered, while still avoiding the 25% US chicken tax tariffs imposed on imported commercial vans and trucks. However, Ford cancelled these plans due to declining sales of the small van segment in those markets.

Fleet usage

Grumman LLV replacement 

On 18 March 2010, Canada Post and Ford Motor Company announced that Canada Post would purchase a fleet of Ford Transit Connect vans to replace their aging fleet of Grumman LLV vehicles. Right-hand-drive tooling already existed for the versions sold in RHD markets, but all Canada Post Transit Connects are left-hand drive.

Taxicab

In fleet (taxi) applications, Ford markets the Ford Transit Connect Wagon as a replacement for the Ford Crown Victoria LWB (discontinued in 2011).  For taxi use, modifications include shifting the rear seat several inches rearward (to increase legroom and to allow for the fitment of a partition), rear-seat climate controls, and school bus yellow paint.

By 2011, the Transit Connect was one of three finalists (alongside the Karsan V-1 and the Nissan NV200)  in the New York City Taxi of Tomorrow bid, in a potential 10-year contract to supply the city with taxicabs exclusively.  While losing the Taxi of Tomorrow bid to the Nissan NV200, the Transit Connect Wagon remains in use as a taxicab replacement for the Crown Victoria in New York City (as an accessible cab) and other American municipalities, as well as Hong Kong.

Variants

Transit Connect Electric

At the 2009 Chicago Auto Show, Ford confirmed development of a battery-powered version of the Transit Connect. Later at the Geneva Auto Show the same year, Ford showed a prototype electric version of the Ford Tourneo Connect passenger van, which is closely related to the Ford Transit Connect. Ford originally announced Smith Electric Vehicles would install the electric drivetrains and lithium-ion battery packs in the vehicles, but they later partnered with Azure Dynamics Corporation instead, with Johnson Controls-Saft as the battery supplier.

Production of the Transit Connect Electric began in December 2010, and Azure Dynamics is the official manufacturer of record. The electric van costs , which more than doubles the price of the gas-powered version even after federal and any state or local incentives for electric vehicles is discounted.

Transit Connect X-Press
In 2004, Ford of Europe created the Ford Transit Connect X-Press, based upon a pre-production Transit Connect prototype and a 212 hp 2.0L engine of the Ford Focus RS.  Using a short-wheelbase cargo van with a rear liftgate, the X-Press is fitted with the front suspension, four-wheel disc brakes, and steering of the Focus RS.  The cargo bay is fitted with a full-body roll cage along with two spare tires.

During 2006, the Transit Connect X-Press saw minor exterior changes to better reflect the production vehicle.

Tourneo Connect
The Ford Tourneo Connect is a leisure activity vehicle produced by Ford, which was first put into production in 2002 to the British market. Much like the Tourneo is a passenger version of the Transit, the Tourneo Connect was designed with rear windows and seats. Principally termed a commercial vehicle, Ford predicted relatively low sales of between 800 and 1000 mainly to taxi operators, due to its given status as a commercial vehicle. However, Ford described the Connect as a 'dual use' vehicle, equally able to meet business and leisure needs. It was put into production to rival the similar models of the Citroën Berlingo, Peugeot Partner, Volkswagen Caddy, Fiat Doblò and the Opel/Vauxhall Combo Tour.

The Connect, when first sold, was the only vehicle of its kind to offer folding and separately removable 60/40 split rear seats that allowed multiple seating formations and increased load capacity. It also boasted the option of twin sliding side load doors as well as rear doors or a tailgate, whereas neither of its main competitors have this option. The Connect's design emphasizes Ford's ideal that the vehicle be multipurpose.

Electric
Ford presented the Ford Tourneo Connect battery electric concept vehicle at the 2009 Geneva Motor Show.
Its BEV technology was developed in collaboration with Smith Electric Vehicles.

Sales

References

External links

Official UK site
Official US site

Transit Connect
Transit Connect
Mini MPVs
Vans
Vehicles introduced in 2002
2000s cars
2010s cars
Production electric cars
Cars of Turkey
Taxi vehicles
Cars of Spain